Opoboa is a genus of moths in the subfamily Lymantriinae. The genus was erected by Tessmann in 1921.

Species
Opoboa bolivari (Kheil, 1909) Nigeria
Opoboa chrysoparala Collenette, 1932 Gold Coast of Africa
Opoboa vitrea (Aurivillius, 1910) Gabon
Opoboa shultzei Tessmann, 1921 Nigeria

References

Lymantriinae